Glenville is the name of several places.

In Canada:
 Glenville, Ontario
 Glenville, Cumberland County, Nova Scotia
 Glenville, Inverness County, Nova Scotia

In Ireland:
 Glenville, County Cork

In the United Kingdom
 Glenville, County Antrim (also known as Leamore), a townland in the civil parish of Layd, County Antrim, Northern Ireland

In the United States of America:
 Glenville, Alabama
 Glenville (Eutaw, Alabama) a house on the National Register of Historic Places in Eutaw, Alabama
 Glenville, Arkansas, a place in Nevada County
 Glenville, California, former name of Glennville, California
 Glenville, Connecticut
 Glenville, Delaware
 Glenville, Minnesota
 Glenville, Mississippi, a community in Panola County
Glenville, Schenectady County, New York
 Glenville, North Carolina
 Glenville, Pennsylvania
 Glenville, West Virginia
 Glenville, Cleveland, a neighborhood in Cleveland, Ohio
 Glenville Shootout, which took place there

See also
 Glennville (disambiguation) 
 Glenvil, Nebraska
 Glenvil Township, Clay County, Nebraska